Illegal is a 1932 British UK-Protonoir, crime, drama film directed by William C. McGann and starring Isobel Elsom, Ivor Barnard and D. A. Clarke-Smith.

It was made as a quota quickie at Teddington Studios by the British branch of Warner Brothers.

Synopsis
After her second husband drinks and gambles all her money away, a woman leaves him and decides to set up an out-of-hours drinking and gambling club in order to send her daughters to elite schools.

Cast
 Isobel Elsom as Mrs. Evelyn Dean  
 Ivor Barnard as Albert  
 D. A. Clarke-Smith as Franklyn Dean  
 Margot Grahame as Dorothy Turner 
 Moira Lynd as Ann Turner  
 Edgar Norfolk as Lord Alan Sevington  
 Wally Patch as Bookie
 Margaret Damer as Headmistress

References

Bibliography
 Chibnall, Steve. Quota Quickies: The Birth of the British 'B' Film. British Film Institute, 2007.
 Low, Rachael. Filmmaking in 1930s Britain. George Allen & Unwin, 1985.
 Wood, Linda. British Films, 1927–1939. British Film Institute, 1986.

External links
 
 
 
 

1932 films
1932 drama films
British drama films
Films shot at Teddington Studios
Warner Bros. films
Films directed by William C. McGann
Quota quickies
Films set in London
British black-and-white films
1930s English-language films
1930s British films